Via Severiana was an ancient Roman road in central Italy leading in Latium (modern Lazio), running southeast from Portus to Tarracina (passing trought the Isola Sacra), a distance of 80 Roman miles (c. ) along the coast. 
A restoration and reunion of existing roads was carried out with a work of lastrification in 198–209AD, during the reign of emperor Septimius Severus (from which the road would have taken its name), in order to connect more quickly the maritime towns of Ostia, Lavinium, Ardea, Antium and the routes that came there from Rome.

Although the remains of the via Severiana are scanty, there are traces of at least two Roman bridges along the road: on the border between Laurentum and Ostia there was one, which according to an inscription was restored by the emperors Carus and Carinus, and the second one is located in the area of Torre Astura (ancient Astura).  

The Tabula Peutingeriana, a map considered datable to the 4th century AD (or ca. 250 AD ), shows an anonymous Roman road that crossed several stations (stationes), including Hostis (Ostia, the starting point), Laurentum, Lavinium, Antium, Astura and Tarracina (Ardea is not present). According to an orientation, the road represented in the Tabula would be only apparently coastal (it was considered that the stretch that ran from Lavinium to Antium would have been internal), therefore unidentifiable with the Via Severiana, which instead, according to a theory, never detached from the sea.

It was also believed that the name Severiana attributed to the road would be actually a modern conception.

See also 
 Roman road
 Roman bridge
 Roman engineering

References

External links
Page about Via Severania excavations 

Severiana, Via
Septimius Severus